Alias John Preston is a 1955 British thriller film directed by David MacDonald and starring Betta St. John, Alexander Knox and Christopher Lee. Its plot is about a mysterious and wealthy man who moves to a small village where he outwardly appears to be a friendly figure but nurses a dangerous secret.

Cast
 Betta St. John - Sally Sandford 
 Alexander Knox - Doctor Peter Walton 
 Christopher Lee - John Preston 
 Sandra Dorne - Maria 
 Patrick Holt - Sylvia's Husband in Dream
 John Stuart - Doctor Underwood 
 Bill Fraser - Joe Newton 
 Peter Grant - Bob Newton 
 Betty Ann Davies - Mrs Sandford 
 John Longden - Richard Sandford

Critical reception
TV Guide called the film "a poorly developed psychological drama", while Allmovie described it as "an average psychological mystery worth watching for the good performances."

References

External links

1955 films
1955 horror films
1950s psychological thriller films
British black-and-white films
British horror films
British mystery thriller films
Films directed by David MacDonald (director)
1950s psychological horror films
1950s English-language films
1950s British films